This is a list of Panjabi films of the 2000s. For a complete alphabetical list, see :Category:Punjabi films.

2000
List of Punjabi films of 2000

2001
List of Punjabi films of 2001

2002
List of Punjabi films of 2002

2003
List of Punjabi films of 2003

2004
List of Punjabi films of 2004

2005
List of Punjabi films of 2005

2006
List of Punjabi films of 2006

2007
List of Punjabi films of 2007

2008
List of Punjabi films of 2008

2009
List of Punjabi films of 2009

2000s
Punjabi